The Edict of Fontainebleau (22 October 1685) was an edict issued by French King Louis XIV and is also known as the Revocation of the Edict of Nantes. The Edict of Nantes (1598) had granted Huguenots the right to practice their religion without state persecution. Protestants had lost their independence in places of refuge under Cardinal Richelieu on account of their supposed insubordination, but they continued to live in comparative security and political contentment. From the outset, religious toleration in France had been a royal, rather than popular, policy.

The lack of universal adherence to his religion did not sit well with Louis XIV's vision of perfected autocracy.

Edict of Nantes

The Edict of Nantes had been issued on 13 April 1598 by Henry IV of France and granted the Calvinist Protestants of France, also known as Huguenots, substantial rights in the predominantly-Catholic state. Henry aimed at promoting civil unity by the edict. The edict treated some Protestants with tolerance and opened a path for secularism. It offered general freedom of conscience to individuals and many specific concessions to the Protestants, such as amnesty and the reinstatement of their civil rights, including the rights to work in any field, including for the state, and to bring grievances directly to the king. It marked the end of the French Wars of Religion, which had afflicted France during the second half of the 16th century.

Revocation 

By the Edict of Fontainebleau, Louis XIV revoked the Edict of Nantes and ordered the destruction of Huguenot churches as well as the closing of Protestant schools. The edict made official the policy of persecution that was already enforced since the dragonnades that he had created in 1681 to intimidate Huguenots into converting to Catholicism. As a result of the officially-sanctioned persecution by the dragoons, who were billeted upon prominent Huguenots, many Protestants, estimates ranging from 210,000 to 900,000, left France over the next two decades. They sought asylum in the United Provinces, Sweden, Switzerland, Brandenburg-Prussia, Denmark, Scotland, England, Protestant states of the Holy Roman Empire, the Cape Colony in Africa and North America. On 17 January 1686, Louis XIV claimed that out of a Huguenot population of 800,000 to 900,000, only 1,000 to 1,500 had remained in France. 

It has long been said that a strong advocate for persecution of the Protestants was Louis XIV's pious second wife, Madame de Maintenon, who was thought to have urged Louis to revoke Henry IV's edict. There is no formal proof of that, and such views have now been challenged. Madame de Maintenon was by birth a Catholic but was also the grand-daughter of Agrippa d'Aubigné, an unrelenting Calvinist. Protestants tried to turn Madame de Maintenon and any time she took the defence of Protestants, she was suspected of relapsing into her family faith. Thus, her position was thin, which wrongly led people to believe that she advocated persecutions.

The revocation of the Edict of Nantes brought France into line with virtually every other European country of the period (with the exception of the Principality of Transylvania and the Polish–Lithuanian Commonwealth), which legally tolerated only the majority state religion. The French experiment of religious tolerance in Europe was effectively ended for the time being.

Effects 
 The Edict of Fontainebleau is compared by many historians with the 1492 Alhambra Decree ordering the Expulsion of the Jews from Spain and the Expulsion of the Moriscos in 1609 to 1614. All three are similar both as outbursts of religious intolerance ending periods of relative tolerance and in their social and economic effects. In practice, the revocation caused France to suffer a kind of early brain drain, as it lost many skilled craftsmen, including key designers such as Daniel Marot. Upon leaving France, Huguenots took with them knowledge of important techniques and styles, which had a significant effect on the quality of the silk, plate glass, silversmithing, watchmaking and cabinet making industries of those regions to which they relocated. Some rulers, such as Frederick Wilhelm, Duke of Prussia and Elector of Brandenburg, who issued the Edict of Potsdam in late October 1685, encouraged the Protestants to seek refuge in their nations. Similarly, in 1720 Frederick IV of Denmark invited the French Huguenots to seek refuge in Denmark, which they accepted, settling in Fredericia and other locations.

Abolition
In practice, the stringency of policies outlawing Protestants was opposed by the Jansenists and was relaxed during the reign of Louis XV, especially among discreet members of the upper classes. "The fact that a hundred years later, when Protestants were again tolerated, many of them were found to be both commercially prosperous and politically loyal indicates that they fared far better than the Catholic Irish", R.R. Palmer concluded.

By the late 18th century, numerous prominent French philosophers and literary men of the day, including Anne-Robert-Jacques Turgot, were arguing strongly for religious tolerance. Efforts by Guillaume-Chrétien de Malesherbes, minister to Louis XVI, and Jean-Paul Rabaut Saint-Étienne, a spokesman for the Protestant community, together with members of a provincial appellate court or parlement of the Ancien Régime, were particularly effective in persuading the king to open French society despite concerns expressed by some of his advisors. Thus, on 7 November 1787, Louis XVI signed the Edict of Versailles, known as the edict of tolerance registered in the parlement  months later, on 29 January 1788. The edict offered relief to the main alternative faiths of Calvinist Huguenots, Lutherans and Jews by giving their followers civil and legal recognition as well as the right to form congregations openly after 102 years of prohibition.

Full religious freedom had to wait two more years, with enactment of the Declaration of the Rights of Man and of the Citizen. The 1787 edict was a pivotal step in eliminating religious strife, however, and officially ended religious persecution in France. Moreover, when French revolutionary armies invaded other European countries between 1789 and 1815, they followed a consistent policy of emancipating persecuted or circumscribed religious communities (Roman Catholic in some countries, Protestant in others and Jewish in most).

Apology
In October 1985, in the tricentenary of the Edict of Fontainebleau, French President François Mitterrand issued a public apology to the descendants of Huguenots around the world.

Famous Huguenots who left France
 Jean Barbot
 Jean Chardin
 de la Font 
 Jean Luzac (see also Nouvelles Extraordinaires de Divers Endroits)
 Daniel Marot
 Abraham de Moivre
 Denis Papin
 Duke of Schomberg

See also 

 War of the Camisards
 French Wars of Religion
 Religions in France
 Edict of Potsdam
 1731 Expulsion of Protestants from Salzburg
 Savoyard–Waldensian wars
 Brain Drain
 End of the persecution of Huguenots and restoration of French citizenship
 Right of return to France

References

Further reading 
 Baird, Henry Martyn. The Huguenots and the Revocation of the Edict of Nantes (1895)  online.
 Dubois, E. T. "The revocation of the edict of Nantes — Three hundred years later 1685–1985."  History of European Ideas  8#3 (1987): 361-365. reviews 9 new books. online
 Scoville, Warren Candler. The persecution of Huguenots and French economic development, 1680-1720 (1960).
 Scoville, Warren C. "The Huguenots in the French economy, 1650–1750." Quarterly Journal of Economics 67.3 (1953): 423-444.

External links 
 Revocation of the Edict of Nantes
 Edict of Fontainebleau - text

1685 in France
Fontainebleau
Religion in the Ancien Régime
Huguenot history in France
Louis XIV
Christianity and law in the 17th century
Religion and politics
Persecution of the Huguenots
1685 in religion
Religious expulsion orders